South Melbourne Football Club is an Australian semi-professional association football club based in Albert Park, Melbourne. The club was formed in 1959 as three clubs South Melbourne United, Hellenic and Yarra Park before it was shortly renamed to South Melbourne Hellas in 1960.

Before their entrance into the National Soccer League in 1977, South Melbourne won 8 premierships, 2 Dockerty Cups and 2 Ampol Cups. It was until the 1984 season, where South Melbourne won their first national competitive league in the Southern Conference. During the club's stadium move to Bob Jane Stadium (now Lakeside Stadium), the club were known as the South Melbourne Lakers with failure aspects afterwards, they won the 1997–98 season of the National Soccer League and won another championship the next season which was their last in their National Soccer League career.

A move to the Bob Jane Stadium and a nickname change in the mid 90s injected new life into the club. South were known as the Lakers and after the 'failure' - by South's high standards - of the early to mid 90s (five Preliminary Final defeats), South Melbourne were able to shrug the finals monkey off its back by winning the 1997–98 Ericsson Cup.

As of the end of the 2020–21 season, the club's first team have spent 28 seasons in the National Soccer League, 33 in the top division of Victoria and the one in the second division of Victoria. Their worst finish to date is 14th in the National Soccer League, their placing at the end of the 1979 season. The club's longest period without a competitive honour is 7 years, between the 2007 and 2013 seasons.

Key
Key to league competitions:

 National Soccer League (NSL)
 National Premier Leagues Victoria (NPL Victoria)
 Football League First Division (Metro League 1)

 Victorian State League (State League)

Key to colours and symbols:

Key to league record:
 Season = The year and article of the season
 Pos = Final position
 Pld = Matches played
 W = Matches won
 D = Matches drawn
 L = Matches lost
 GF = Goals scored
 GA = Goals against
 Pts = Points

Key to cup record:
 En-dash (–) = South Melbourne did not participate
 DNE = The club did not enter cup/finals play
 Group = Group stage
 R1 = First round
 R2 = Second round, etc.
 R32 = Round of 32
 R16 = Round of 16
 QF = Quarter-finals
 SF = Semi-finals
 RU = Runners-up
 W = Winners

Seasons

References
General
 
 

Specific

South Melbourne FC seasons
South Melbourne FC
Seasons